Alban Bunjaku (born 20 May 1994) is a professional footballer who last played as an attacking midfielder for Dutch club Dordrecht. Born in England, he represented Kosovo at international level.

Club career

Early career
Born in London, Bunjaku joined the Arsenal F.C. Academy in 2002, at the age of eight.

Sevilla
After scoring fifteen goals in twenty-three starts for the under-18 side, Bunjaku left Arsenal to sign for La Liga club Sevilla. He spent the 2012–13 season with the club's reserve side, Sevilla Atlético, in the Segunda División B. He made his debut on 14 October 2012 in the 8th game week against Cartagena, coming on as a substitute in the 89th minute in place of Álex Rubio. The match finished in a 2–2 draw. He scored first goal on 4 November 2012 in the 11th game week against Melilla and gave Sevilla Atlético the 0–1 away victory when he scored in the 53rd minute, but was replaced only 12 minutes later by Joaquín García.

Derby County
On 10 June 2014, it was announced that Bunjaku had returned to England to sign a two-year contract with Championship side Derby County. Head coach Steve McClaren said that Bunjaku had potential to do well at Derby, given his experience gained from a decade with Arsenal and also from his short time at Sevilla Atlético.

After spending time mainly with the under-21 side, Bunjaku left the club months before the end of his contract by mutual consent.

Dordrecht
On 18 January 2016, shortly after leaving Derby County, Bunjaku signed with Dordrecht of the Eerste Divisie. He made his debut for the club on the same day in a league match against Emmen. He came on as a 63rd-minute substitute for Ibrahim Touré as Dordrecht lost the match 2–0.

International career
In January 2012, the media reported that the Albanian Football Association were trying to convince the player to be part of their national team, since the English Football Association had not made him any invitation to play for the English national side. He was called up to represent Albania under-19, after the English youth team overlooked him.

In May 2014, Bunjaku was called up to the Kosovo national football team for the friendly matches against Turkey and Senegal. On 21 May 2014, Bunjaku made his international debut for Kosovo against Turkey, coming on as a substitute in the 60th minute in place of Lum Rexhepi in a 1–6 loss at the Adem Jashari Olympic Stadium, Mitrovica, Kosovo.

Career statistics

International

References

External links
 
 
 FC Dordrecht Profile .

1994 births
Living people
Footballers from Romford
English people of Albanian descent
English people of Kosovan descent
Association football midfielders
English footballers
Kosovan footballers
Kosovo international footballers
Ascot United F.C. players
Sevilla Atlético players
Segunda División B players
FC Dordrecht players
Eerste Divisie players
Expatriate footballers in Spain
English expatriate sportspeople in Spain
Kosovan expatriate sportspeople in Spain
Expatriate footballers in the Netherlands
English expatriate sportspeople in the Netherlands
Kosovan expatriate sportspeople in the Netherlands
Arsenal F.C. players